National College is a Namma Metro station on the Green Line serving Basavanagudi and the National College areas of Bengaluru. It was opened to the public on 18 June 2017.

Station layout

Entry/Exits
There are 3 Entry/Exit points – A, B and C. Commuters can use either of the points for their travel.

 Entry/Exit point A: Towards Vishveshwara Puram side
 Entry/Exit point B: Towards Vishveshwara Puram side
 Entry/Exit point C: Towards Shankarapura side

See also
Bangalore
List of Namma Metro stations
Transport in Karnataka
List of metro systems
List of rapid transit systems in India

References

External links

 Bangalore Metro Rail Corporation Ltd. (Official site) 
 UrbanRail.Net – descriptions of all metro systems in the world, each with a schematic map showing all stations.

Namma Metro stations
Railway stations in India opened in 2017
2017 establishments in Karnataka
Railway stations in Bangalore